Ab Bad-e Pedari (also Romanized as Āb Bād-e Pedarī; also known as Āb Bād, Āb Bād-e Peders, and Āb Yād-e Badrī) is a village in Khabar Rural District, in the Central District of Baft County, Kerman Province, Iran. At the 2006 census, its population was 12, in 4 families.

References 

Populated places in Baft County